In nuclear physics, neutron decay may refer to:
 Neutron emission by an atomic nucleus
 Free neutron decay
 Beta decay of a neutron inside an atomic nucleus
 Baryon decay, as predicted by grand unified theories, also involves neutron decay